Phiala unistriga is a moth in the family Eupterotidae. It was described by Max Gaede in 1927. It is found in Malawi.

References

Moths described in 1927
Eupterotinae